Collaboration Data Objects (CDO), previously known as OLE Messaging or Active Messaging, is an application programming interface included with Microsoft Windows and Microsoft Exchange Server products. The library allows developers to access the Global Address List and other server objects, in addition to the contents of mailboxes and public folders.

Overview
CDO is a technology for building messaging or collaboration applications. CDO can be used separately or in connection with Outlook Object Model to gain more access over Outlook. CDO is not a part of Outlook Object Model and it doesn't provide any event-based functionality, nor can Outlook objects be manipulated using CDO.

Starting with Exchange 2007, neither the Messaging API (MAPI) client libraries nor CDO 1.2.1 are provided as a part of the base product installation.  They are available as downloads.

Versions
CDONTS: available on Windows NT 4.0 by installing the Option Pack, or Exchange Server.
CDOSYS: available on Windows 2000 and onwards by installing the SMTP service in Internet Information Server (IIS).

See also
 Collaboration Data Objects for Windows NT Server
 MAPI
 ActiveX

References

External links
 j-XChange - Pure and Open Source (LGPL v3) Java implementation of the Collaboration Data Objects (CDO 1.21) for accessing Microsoft Exchange Server in a platform independent manner.
 Overview of CDO - Overview of CDO at MSDN
 CDOSYS protocol

Downloads
 ExchangeMapiCdo.EXE download
 ExchangeCdo.MSI download

Microsoft application programming interfaces
Email